Emma Gee is an American activist and writer, who coined the term "Asian American" with Yuji Ichioka.

Biography 
In 1968, Chinese American Gee and her Japanese American partner and future husband Yuji Ichioka, both graduate students at University of California, Berkeley, founded the Asian American Political Alliance and coined the term "Asian American." She was instrumental in bringing together writings from Asians in America, most notably in the work Counterpoint (1978). Gee taught some of the earliest classes in Asian American studies at Berkeley and University of California, Los Angeles.

Gee is also an advocate of Asian American women and urged them to write and share prose and poetry. This included editing the book Asian Women (1971), developed from the first class ever taught on Asian Women in Berkeley. She was later also involved in the Pacific Asian American Women Writers West, established in 1978.

In 2004, UCLA's Asian American Studies Center created the "Yuji Ichioka and Emma Gee Endowment for Social Justice and Immigration Studies" in honor of Ichioka and Gee's work.

Works

References 

Year of birth missing (living people)
Living people
20th-century American historians
20th-century American women writers
American academics of Chinese descent
Historians from California
American women writers of Chinese descent

University of California, Berkeley alumni
University of California, Los Angeles faculty